Tyson Gray (born 14 April 1964) is a Jamaican boxer. He competed in the men's featherweight event at the 1996 Summer Olympics.

References

External links
 

1964 births
Living people
Jamaican male boxers
Olympic boxers of Jamaica
Boxers at the 1996 Summer Olympics
Place of birth missing (living people)
Featherweight boxers